"A Smattering of Intelligence" was the final episode in season two of the American television series M*A*S*H. It first aired on March 2, 1974. The character of Lieutenant Colonel Sam Flagg (played by Edward Winter) was first introduced by name in this episode.  Winter portrayed a similar character called Captain Halloran eleven episodes earlier in "Deal Me Out", and the two are implied in "Quo Vadis, Captain Chandler?" to have been one and the same. Flagg has any number of aliases.

Overview
After a helicopter crash at the 4077 M*A*S*H the only casualty is the infamous LTC (Lieutenant Colonel) Flagg who is laid up at the 4077th with a broken arm.  He reveals that he suspects a security leak in the camp and will be investigating, presenting LTC Henry Blake with a number of aliases and demanding his full cooperation.  Meanwhile, Hawkeye and Trapper John meet Trapper's friend Captain Pratt, who is an Army Intelligence officer. Pratt is undercover at the hospital to see what Flagg is up to, suspecting that Flagg had ordered the helicopter to crash and then broke his own arm in order to "infiltrate" the 4077th. Pratt explains his presence in the camp to Frank Burns by saying that the US Army Engineers are thinking of making MASHes amphibious—a story Frank gullibly believes.  Pratt also blackmails Henry into cooperating with him by showing him evidence of his numerous marital infidelities while in the US.  Soon the two spies are after each other, and Hawkeye and Trapper John decide to have some fun by tricking both spies into going after Major Frank Burns, making Pratt believe Burns is a right wing fascist and making Flagg believe Burns is a left wing communist.

Notes 
In episode 3.23 when Lieutenant Colonel Flagg appears, Hawkeye and Trapper remark on how the last time he was at the 4077th, Flagg not only broke his own arm {seen in this episode} but rigged a jeep to run over himself—this last incident is not in this episode but did appear in Episode 2.13, Flagg's/Halloran's first appearance, which includes a minor plot about a local man ("Whiplash Wang") who throws himself in front of U.S. Army vehicles to feign injury for profit; in this episode, Flagg similarly intentionally injures himself with an Army vehicle to advance his investigation.
An anachronism appears in this episode. As Radar pretends to be asleep when Flagg leaves Henry's office, a copy of Avengers (vol. 1) #60 can be seen on his chest, which was not published until 1968.
At the end of the episode's second act, Pratt takes pictures of the "Swamp" with a spy camera; the final scene (commonly deleted in syndication) has Flagg narrating over slides of various characters and recommending further observation of the 4077th.
The season 4 episode "The Late Captain Pierce" features a character named Captain Pratt, but is a different character from the Pratt in this episode.

External links

1974 American television episodes
M*A*S*H (season 2) episodes